Maeror Tri was an ambient, noise and drone music band from Germany founded in the 1980s which consisted of Stefan "Baraka H" Knappe, Martin "GLIT[s]CH" Gitschel and Helge S. Hammerbrook.

In a way similar to Zoviet France, they used only live instruments to produce music with an enormous number of effects applied. They disbanded in the late 1990s after releasing a number of limited-edition records. They released music on labels such as Old Europa Cafe, Ant-Zen, Staalplaat, and Soleilmoon.

Stefan and Martin continued under the name of Troum, while Helge is recording as Tausendschoen and as H.S. Hammerbrook. Stefan Knappe is also the founder and owner of Drone Records.

German band Maeror Tri was founded in April 1988 by Stefan Knappe and Helge S. Hammerbrook (in early years as Helge as Moune). 
The group consisted of three members who only used electric guitars and tons of processing devices to create their droning soundscapes. Their music borrowed elements from Industrial, Avantgarde, Minimalism and New Age meditation to reach a new form of transcendentalism.
Very little is known about their origins, even the identity of the band’s members remains vague, except for Stefan Knappe, the group's spokesperson and also owner of the label Drone Records. Nevertheless it is for sure that all three members origin from the city Leer in northern Germany and know each other since their time in school.

The name they chose is probably an incorrect Latin expression that may be better translated as "The Mourning Three" or "The Grieving Three".

"Dedicated To A New Dawn", their first cassette, was self-released on their own Baracken Records in 1988, soon followed by many more cassette works on labels like ZNS, Tonspur and Audiofile, and a lot of compilations appearances.

In 1993 Korm Plastics (a label ran by Frans de Waard) released the very first "overground" Maeror Tri album "Multiple Personality Disorder" a concept CD divided in four long parts recorded back in 1991 that fully showcase their mastery in distorting and layering guitar sounds. It was soon followed by "Meditamentum", a collection of selected tape tracks recorded from 1988 to 1993.

"Myein", a monumental work recorded between 1992 and 1993, was released on american label ND in 1995. This work presented three long tracks that well exemplify some of the aspects of their art: the gothic droning of "Phlogiston", the ambient-electronica of "Desiderium", and the cosmic doodling of the 47 minutes long title track.

"Language of Flames and Sound", released on Italian label Old Europa Cafe in 1996, continued to chronicle the group's evolution into more abstract domains.

In late 1996, as the group was about to break into the growing experimental electronica scene, one member of the band, Helge S. Moune, decided to quit, leaving Knappe and his other partner to continue as the duo Troum.

"Mort aux Vaches", a symphony in three movements and the group's installment in Staalplaat's series of experimental electronica, and "Emotional Engramm" (on Iris Light), probably their most accessible recording, were both released posthumous in 1997.

Archive material has continued to surface over the years after the group ceased to exist: a second volume of "Meditamentum", released on Manifold in 1999, salvaged more material from the early years limited edition cassettes, while the "Hypnotikum I" and "Hypnotikum II" LPs are valid examples of the group's live attitude.

Discography - LPs/EPs/singles

Discography - Compilation appearances

Notes
Some Maeror Tri material is available for free download.

ZNS Tapes, long defunct tape label from Germany is offering catalogue of all music released by the label during its existence from 1987 to 1993. Some of the offered works include "Ambient Dreams" by Maeror Tri and a compilation called "Non-Nuclear War" to which Maeror Tri contributed track called "Ecstatic Singing". Link

See also 
List of ambient music artists

External links

Noise musical groups
Dark ambient music groups
Drone music groups